Alfredo Tantay (born March 15, 1956), also known by his stage name Al Tantay,  is a Filipino film actor, comedian, director and the former husband of Rio Locsin. He was discovered by Joey Gosiengfiao and was launched through the Regal Films movie, Iskandalo (Scandals), starring Lorna Tolentino in July 1979. In 1987, he played his first villain role to Rudy Fernandez in the action film Humanda Ka, Ikaw Ang Susunod (You Get Ready, You Are Next).

On television, Tantay became a regular actor in the sitcom, Duplex playing neighbor to Ading Fernando and Marissa Delgado. He also join the Goin Bananas group with Christopher de Leon, Jay Ilagan, Johnny Delgado and Edgar Mortiz.

When he did VH Films' "Gamitin Mo Ako" in 1985 under National Artist Ishmael Bernal and sharing stellar billing with Rita Gomez and newbie Stella "Pinky" Suarez, he fell in love with the former.

As a film director, he has directed several comedy films such as Mana-Mana, Tiba-Tiba, S2pid Love and A.B. Normal College.

Filmography

Director

Television

External links

1956 births
Living people
Filipino male film actors
Filipino male television actors
Filipino male comedians
Filipino television directors
Filipino film directors
ABS-CBN personalities
GMA Network personalities